BS 5454, "Recommendations for the storage and exhibition of archival documents" was a British Standard for the construction of building repositories for archive collections. It specified security standards, fire resistance, structural qualities for document storage buildings and their locations, environmental parameters (temperature and humidity ranges) designed to protect documents, shelving schemes, and materials for document containers.  It was withdrawn in 2012, being replaced by BSI PD 5454:2012 Guide for the Storage and Exhibition of Archival Materials.  PD 5454 was a temporary Guide, used as a 'stop-gap' while a new CEN standard was being developed.  The new standard, EN 16893:2018 replaced PD 5454 and the latter was also withdrawn.  The full title of EN 16893:2018 is Conservation of Cultural Heritage - Specifications for location, construction and modification of buildings or rooms intended for the storage or use of heritage collections.

For archival and library collections (the original sector at which 5454 was aimed), a reviewed standard, BS 4971, was released in 2017.  EN 16893 focused on the qualities of planning and construction of a building intended to hold heritage collections of all forms (so not just archives) and as such does not hold environmental requirements for any specific heritage.  To ensure continuity in the UK, where archive and library professionals had been used to using the old 5454 as a source for specific environmental requirements, BS 4971 was changed to cover those environmental parameters.  The language of EN 16893 and its environmental requirements push the sector towards ceasing to use HVAC systems for environmental control and instead to commission storage construction to be air-tight and thermally stable and thereby provide very slow changing humidity conditions seasonally without the need for HVAC systems which, over the decades since BS 5454:1989, had proven to be a failure at protecting collections.  BS 4971:2017 Conservation and care of archive and library collections takes the same approach and references EN 16893 for construction qualities.

The fire, water and security resistance qualities of buildings containing all heritage forms are now covered in EN 16893, as in the old BS 5454, but reviewed and updated.  The new standard also takes over the planning and decision-making elements from another BS Guide, PAS 198:2012, promoting a risk-assessment approach to defining the protective qualities of heritage stores and display or reading spaces.

External links 
 Business Archives Council: Frequently Asked Questions

Archival science
05454
Preservation (library and archival science)